The 1877–78 season was the seventh season of competitive football by Queen's Park.

Scottish Cup

Queen's Park played only four competitive fixtures in 1877–78 as they were knocked out of the Scottish Cup by eventual runners-up 3rd Lanark RV in the third round.

FA Cup

Queen's Park received a bye through to the second round but they withdrew before their match with Welsh side Druids.

Glasgow Merchants' Charity Cup
Originally, Queen's Park were due to play Rangers in the first round but instead advanced straight to the final while Rangers played 3rd Lanark RV instead. The club retained the cup after they defeated Vale of Leven in the final.

Friendlies

References

1877–78
Queen's Park
1877–78 in Scottish football